Kavitha Nair is an Indian television presenter, actor, model, writer and blogger. She won the 2019 Kerala State Television Award for Best Actress for her performance in Thonnyaksharangal.

Personal life
She is from Kottayam and attended Baker Memorial Girls High School in Kottayam. She is married to Vipin and is settled in Bengaluru.

Biography
She started her career as a host with the TV show Ponpulari  on Surya TV and went on to host several popular shows and award nights establishing herself as one of the best Television anchors in Malayalam. Meanwhile, she did a few TV serials of which her notable works include Vadakakkoru Hridayam, Ayalathe Sundari and Thonnyaksharangal all directed by K.K. Rajeev.

She has written Sundarapathanangal, a compilation of 20 Malayalam short stories written in a span of three years. The preface has been written by Mohanlal.

She has acted in Malayalam films Mampazhakkalam, Hotel California, And the Oscar goes to, 10 Kalpanakal, Daffedar and Elam.

Television

TV serials

TV Shows

Filmography

References

Living people
Year of birth missing (living people)
Place of birth missing (living people)
Indian film actresses
Indian female models
Indian women writers
Indian women television presenters
Indian television presenters
Indian female dancers
Actresses in Malayalam television
Actresses in Malayalam cinema
Actresses from Kottayam
Actresses from Bangalore
Indian women bloggers